Jessica Vitak is an American information scientist who is an associate professor at the University of Maryland. She is faculty in the University of Maryland College of Information Studies (iSchool) and Communication Department. She serves as Director of the University of Maryland Human–Computer Interaction Lab (HCIL) and an Associate Member of the Social Data Science Center (SoDa).

Early life and education 
Vitak studied journalism and communication at Elon University. After completing undergraduate studies, she moved to Washington, D.C. and worked for PR Newswire. She received a master's degree from Georgetown University, where she studied online identity and Facebook relationships with Linda Garcia. While at Georgetown, she also worked as a research intern at the Pew Research Center. She earned her doctorate from Michigan State University, joining the research team of Nicole Ellison and Cliff Lampe. Her doctoral research investigated the relationship between Facebook use and maintenance strategies.

Research and career 
At UMD, Vitak was appointed as director of the Center for the Advanced Study of Communities and Information in 2016, and simultaneously became associate director of the Human Computer Interaction Lab. She became the director of HCIL in 2021. Vitak has continued to study how new technologies can benefit and harm humans. She studies the underlying motivations for people's behaviors, how humans perceive risks when they approach new technologies, and how policy makers can do more to convey critical information.

Vitak's research has focused on networked privacy and data ethics, identifying the privacy risks of new communication technologies and developing tools, curricula, games, and other resources to increase children and adults' understanding of privacy and security.

Selected publications

References 

American women scientists
Information scientists
University of Maryland, College Park faculty
Living people
Year of birth missing (living people)
Michigan State University alumni
Georgetown University alumni
Elon University alumni